Pitcairnia squarrosa is a plant species in the genus Pitcairnia. This species is native to Ecuador.

References

squarrosa
Flora of Ecuador